Ida Random (born 1945) is an American production designer. She was nominated for an Academy Award in the category Best Art Direction for the film Rain Man.

Selected filmography
The Big Chill (1983)
Body Double (1984)
 Silverado (1985) 
 Who's That Girl (1987) 
 Rain Man (1988)
 The War of the Roses (1989)
 Hoffa (1992)
 The Fan (1996)
 The Postman (1997) 
 Spanglish (2004) 
 The Fast and the Furious: Tokyo Drift (2006)
 Fast & Furious (2009) 
 No Strings Attached (2011)
 Chasing Mavericks (2012)

References

External links

1945 births
Living people
American production designers
Women production designers